"Second Hand Heart" is a song by English singer Ben Haenow, from his self-titled debut studio album, Ben Haenow (2015). Featuring American singer Kelly Clarkson, it is an upbeat pop song produced by Afterhrs, Jason Halbert, and Pete Hammerton, written by Artist vs. Poet members Joe Kirkland and Jason Dean with Afterhrs members Ian Franzino and Andrew Haas, with additional writing by Neil Ormandy. "Second Hand Heart" was issued as the album's lead and only single on 16 October 2015, by Syco Music and RCA Records.

Background and release 
After winning the eleventh series of The X Factor and releasing a cover version of OneRepublic's "Something I Need" as his debut single in December 2014, Haenow was signed to a recording contract with record label Syco Music on 6 January 2015, and on RCA Records on 14 October 2015. Through music mogul Simon Cowell and Sony Music UK executive Sonny Takhar, Haenow invited Kelly Clarkson to be featured on one of the album's tracks. He remarked: "The idea of a feature wasn't on the cards at first. But when I heard the vocals on it I was blown away as it gave the song a whole new dimension." Clarkson also commented that she fell in love with the song upon listening it for the first time, saying: "Lyrically and musically, it is right up my alley."

An upbeat pop rock song accompanied by a subtle country folk undertone, "Second Hand Heart" was produced by Jason Halbert and Pete Hammerton with Ian Franzino and Andrew Haas of Afterhrs, who co-wrote it with Artist vs. Poet members Joe Kirkland and Jason Dean, and songwriter Neil Ormandy. Originally intended to be released on 9 October 2015, Haenow announced that the track would be issued on 16 October 2015 as the lead single from his upcoming self-titled debut studio album. On 2 October 2015, Haenow released a preview of the song.

Live performances and music video 
Filmed by James Lees in Nashville, Tennessee, the song's accompanying music video premiered on Vevo on 20 October 2015. Haenow first performed "Second Hand Heart" in a live performance on the twelfth series of The X Factor on 31 October 2015.

Track listing 
Digital download – Single

Digital download – EP

Credits and personnel 
Credits adapted from the "Second Hand Heart" metadata.

 Vocals – Ben Haenow
 Featured vocals – Kelly Clarkson
 Mixing engineers – Pete Hammerton, Joe Zook
 Mastering engineer – Dick Beetham, Wideboys (Julian Bunetta, Damon Bunetta, Peter Bunetta) (Wideboys Remix)
 Recording engineer – Pete Hammerton

 Producers – Afterhrs (Andrew Haas, Ian Franzino), Jason Halbert, Pete Hammerton, Wideboys (Wideboys Remix)
 Songwriting – Joe Kirkland, Ian Franzino, Jason Dean, Andrew Haas, Neil Ormandy
 Keyboards – Wideboys (Wideboys Remix)
 Remixers – Wideboys (Wideboys Remix)

Charts

Certifications 

|-
! scope="row"  | South Africa (RISA)
| Gold
| 10,000^
|-

Release history

References 

2015 singles
2015 songs
Kelly Clarkson songs
RCA Records singles
Syco Music singles
Torch songs
Songs written by Neil Ormandy
Songs written by Andrew Haas
Songs written by Ian Franzino